The Silicon Valley Leadership Group (abbreviated SVLG) is a non-profit advocacy group in Silicon Valley, California, in the United States. Its members are businesses that operate in the valley and its purpose is to influence public policy relating to the valley.

The organization was founded in 1978 by David Packard, co-founder of Hewlett-Packard, and represents more than 390 Silicon Valley's firms.

History
The group was founded as the Santa Clara County Manufacturers Group (SCCMG) by David Packard in 1978, later becoming the Silicon Valley Manufacturing Group. Like the Bay Area Council, it focused on regional politics. In the 1980s, it became the dominant business advocacy group in the Silicon Valley region, eclipsing chambers of commerce such as the San Jose Chamber of Commerce. By 1982, it counted 85 of the region's largest employers as members. In March 2005, it changed its name to Silicon Valley Leadership Group. Carl Guardino served as CEO from January 1997 through July 2020. On July 23, 2020, Ahmad Thomas was named the new CEO effective August 10, 2020.

Issues

San Francisco Bay Area tax measures 
The Silicon Valley Leadership Group was a key supporter of Regional Measure 3, a $3 per-trip toll increase per vehicle to cross San Francisco Bay Area bridges, approved in June 2018 by 55 percent of Bay Area voters. SVLG is now a key partner along with the Bay Area Council and SPUR in proposing a $100 billion "mega tax" for November 2020 ballots, to pay for high-cost highway and transit projects paid for over 40 years by a one-percent sales tax increase in all nine Bay Area counties. Like RM3, the mega tax, called "Faster Bay Area" by proponents, would require state legislation to authorize the multi-county ballot tax measure. SVLG also supports another multi-county Bay Area 2020 tax increase, a 1/4-percent sales tax for further improvements to Caltrain service, which would apply in San Francisco, San Mateo, and Santa Clara counties.

Santa Clara sales tax measures 
The SVLG has been heavily involved with a number of sales tax increase measures in Santa Clara County; specifically 1996, 2000, and the failed June 2006 measure. In June 2006, SVLG and the South Bay Labor Council outspent their opponents $1.2 million to $50,000 in an effort to raise the county sales tax further. In spite of this huge discrepancy SVLG lost.

At the same time SVLG was campaigning for increasing the local sales tax, they were en route to Sacramento on a lobbying junket to push for two bills - SB 1291 and AB 2218 - that would have exempt companies from state sales taxes for purchasing equipment used in manufacturing and research.

Immigration reform
SVLG advocates immigration reform in the United States, claiming there is a growing lack of skilled labor in Silicon Valley that could be closed by immigration. Specifically, the SVLG advocates increasing the number of H-1B visas and easing access to green cards.

U.S. Patents and Trademarks Office 
SVLG has supported San Jose in its bid for a regional patent office. In 2012, the group claimed the confirmation of San Jose as a host of one of the four regional offices a "big win".

Electrification of Caltrain 
The Silicon Valley Leadership Group has worked in coordination with local leaders to fund the electrification of Caltrain. In May 2017, the Federal Transit Administration approved a $647 million grant for the project. SVLG CEO Carl Guardino described the confirmation of the federal grant as "the major holidays wrapped into one with a beautiful Caltrain bow around it.” In July 2017, a group including Guardino, Caltrain's CEO, elected officials and business leaders celebrated the official groundbreaking of the Caltrain project.

Local philanthropy 
Starting in 2004, the Group has sponsored an annual charity "Turkey Trot" run, with the proceeds going to local charities.  The annual target is $1 million of contributions.

References

External links

 Ourpower.org
 Electric Vehicles International (EVI)
 OEMTEK
 How Silicon Valley could become the Detroit of electric cars.
 A car that could save the planet—fast- Silicon Valley's big brains think they can beat Detroit and Tokyo.

Economy of the San Francisco Bay Area
Silicon Valley
Political advocacy groups in the United States
Politics of San Jose, California
Organizations established in 1978
1978 establishments in California
Organizations based in San Jose, California